Ernest Glover may refer to:

Sir Ernest Glover, 1st Baronet (1864–1934), British shipowner
Ernest Glover (athlete) (1891–1954), English athlete
Pat Glover (Ernest Matthew Glover, 1910–1971), Wales footballer